Enteromius is a genus of small to medium-sized cyprinid fish native to tropical Africa. Most species were placed in the genus Barbus.

Species
Species in this genus are:

References

External links

 
Cyprinid fish of Africa